Houstonia palmeri, the Saltillo bluet, is a plant species in the family Rubiaceae, native to the Mexican states of Coahuila and Nuevo León.

Two varieties are recognized:

Houstonia palmeri var. palmeri
Houstonia palmeri var. muzquizana (B.L.Turner) Terrell

References 

palmeri
Endemic flora of Mexico
Flora of Coahuila
Flora of Nuevo León
Plants described in 1882
Taxa named by Asa Gray